David Harold Franzoni (born March 4, 1947) is an American screenwriter and film producer. He conceived the story for, co-wrote and co-produced the 2000 film Gladiator, for which he was nominated for the Academy Award for Best Original Screenplay and won the Academy Award for Best Picture. His other screenplays include King Arthur (2004), Amistad (1997), and Jumpin’ Jack Flash (1986).

Career 
Franzoni's script for Gladiator was a revival of the sword-and-sandal genre, using characters very different from the original and drawing upon available historic and archaeological sources. He started to write the story in the 1970s, after reading the 1958 non-fiction book Those About to Die by Daniel P. Mannix, which detailed  the Roman gladiatorial games.

For Amistad, Franzoni decided not to use a standard narrative, explaining, "the typical slant in this sort of film is to have the poor, chained black man arrive in the presence of the white guy, who has a good soul and fights the good faith to liberate the black man." Franzoni was also the one who convinced Steven Spielberg to direct the film.

Franzoni stated that the screenplay of King Arthur "aims more for history than myth," and again relied upon archaeological evidence in an attempt to create a more realistic human and political interpretation of the character.

Filmography

References

Bibliography

External links
 

1947 births
Living people
American male screenwriters
Filmmakers who won the Best Film BAFTA Award
Producers who won the Best Picture Academy Award
University of Vermont alumni